L'Anse may refer to:

In Canada
L'Anse aux Meadows, Newfoundland
L'Anse-Saint-Jean, Quebec

In the United States
L'Anse, Michigan, a village in the Upper Peninsula
L'Anse Township, Michigan
L'Anse Indian Reservation

Elsewhere
L'Anse Mitan, Trinidad and Tobago